Arab Rashed (also Romanized as ‘Arab Rāshed and ‘Arbrāshed) is a village in Gheyzaniyeh Rural District, in the Central District of Ahvaz County, Khuzestan Province, Iran. At the 2006 census, its population was 167, in 31 families.

References 

Populated places in Ahvaz County